The women's slalom K-1 canoeing event at the 2015 Pan American Games will be held between the 18 and 19 of July at the Minden Wild Water Preserve in Minden Hills. At the Pan American Sports Organization's 2013 general assembly in Jamaica, canoe slalom competitions were added to the program. This will be the first time slalom has been staged at the Pan American Games. Furthermore, women will also compete in canoe races for the first time ever in both disciplines. The winners of the four canoe slalom competitions (besides the C-1 women event, which is not an Olympic event) will qualify for the 2016 Summer Olympics in Rio de Janeiro, Brazil. If the host nation of the Olympics (Brazil) wins the event, the runner up will qualify instead.

Schedule
The following is the competition schedule for the event:

All times are Eastern Daylight Time (UTC−4)

Results

Heats

Semifinal

Final

References

Canoeing at the 2015 Pan American Games
2015 in women's canoeing